Sırrı Murat Dalkılıç (born 7 August 1983) is a Turkish pop singer, songwriter, music producer, film and animation producer, director and actor.

Career
Murat Dalkılıç was born in İzmir and lived in Kuşadası. He studied piano at the age of 15 and founded his first music group. At a young age, he was also interested in basketball, athleticism, swimming enrolling in Kuşadası Spor Basketball team where he played professionally at age 17 and had to put his music career on hold. He won the medals in Grand Atatürk Run and swimming contest.

He studied at acting department of Beykent University. After graduation, he enrolled in the Master program in Bilgi University specializing in acting in Cinema-Television. He also had international film, music and animation company "Gig Production". Onur Can Çaylı who worked in Game of Thrones, Avengers: Age of Ultron, The Hunger Games: Catching Fire, joined this company. Murat Dalkılıç is also director of film "Ustalar Alemi" and short film "19 Mayıs 100. yıl" .
 He played in Dünya Hali, Bizans Oyunları, Sil Baştan, Mazlum Kuzey.
In December 2020, he appeared as a guest in an episode of the TV series Menajerimi Ara.

Music
His first single "Kasaba" (meaning "town") written by Soner Sarıkabadayı and music composed by Tolga Kılıç was released in October 2008 by Dokuz Sekiz Müzik label gained popularity after being picked by Turkish radio stations. Soon a music video followed that was launched in December 2008. The video featured Dalkılıç' friend Murat Boz. The single reached No.1 on the Türkçe Top 20 chart and stayed at the top of the Turkish charts for a total of seven weeks. He released EP "Kasaba" including his own song and a cover song. He was signed in 2009 to "Sony Music Entertainment", recording three albums.

His first album "Merhaba" released on 4 June 2010. Music clips of songs "La Fontaine", "Külah", "Kıyamadım İkimize", "Merhaba Merhaba", "Dönmem" ve "Çatlat" in the album were released.

His second album had three other singles: "Kader", "Bi Hayli" and "Lüzumsuz Savaş", which topped the charts in 2012. His 2012 single "Bir Güzellik Yap" in same album also topped the Türkçe Top 20.

"İki Yol", "Yani" and "Leyla" were the other singles of the third album. His 2014 single "Derine" also topped the charts. The music video was 9 minutes with a lot of actions and his partner was Özge Özpirincci who is a Turkish famous actress.

He wrote the lyrics of "Kırk Yılda Bir Gibisin" song which was featured on Emrah Karaduman's album. He composed "Ben Kalp Sen" for the series Aşk Yeniden. He is composer of "Fırça" and co-composer of "Şahaneyim" which was performed by Zeynep Bastık. His fourth album Epik was released in 2016 and its first music video "Ben Bilmem" was filmed by Bedran Güzel. His fifth album "Afeta" was released in 2019.

Personal life
From 2015 to 2017, he was married to actress Merve Boluğur.

Discography

Studio albums

EPs

Charts

Music videos

Filmography

Director
Ustalar Alemi
19 Mayıs 100. yıl (short film)

Television

Film

Web

References

External links
 Last.fm page (Turkish)
 
 Murat Dalkılıç on Spotify
 
 

1983 births
Living people
Turkish composers
Turkish pop singers
Turkish songwriters
Beykent University alumni
21st-century Turkish singers
21st-century Turkish male singers
Turkish lyricists